Kantox is a multinational "FinTech" company that offers Currency Management Automation software for corporate clients. Their solution automates the pre-trade, trade, and post-trade stages of the corporate foreign exchange (FX) workflow. 

Kantox has its headquarters in the City of London and offices in the Torre Mapfre in Barcelona, Spain. Their solution has foreign exchange capabilities in 124 currencies and operates in more than 70 countries worldwide. 

They are a founding member of France Fintech, the Spanish Association for Financial Technology (Asociación Española de Technología Financiera) and the European Fintech Association, which all lobby for a greater role of FinTech in their respective countries' financial sectors.

History 
Kantox was founded in 2011 by Philippe Gelis and Antonio Rami, ex-consultants in Deloitte. The name of the company takes inspiration from the surname of Georg Cantor, the creator of the theory of transfinite numbers, a fundamental theory in the transformation of mathematical study in the late nineteenth century. Operating in the FX market, where daily turnover has been estimated by the Bank for International Settlements at $6.6 trillion, In 2014, Kantox raised €6.4 million in investment for their Series A funding round. Since then, Kantox has increased its total funding to over €30 million after closing two venture rounds from their bank partner BNP Paribas and Eurazeo in July 2021. Their solution reached $1 billion in total corporate foreign exchange transactions in 2015. By 2021, Kantox reached $15 billion in total corporate foreign exchange transactions.

Recognition 
In 2015, Kantox was awarded European FinTech of the Year at the European ICT Spring Awards. Kantox has also been named on the Deloitte Technology Fast 50 UK in 2017 and 2018, and the Deloitte Technology Fast 500 EMEA in 2016, 2017 and 2018. 

Kantox’s Dynamic Hedging solution has been the winner of Treasury Management International’s award for Best Risk Management Solution in both 2018 and 2020, and for Best Solution Innovation in 2019 in collaboration with BNP Paribas. It was also voted as the Best e-FX platform for corporates at the 2019 FX Week e-FX Awards.

The company has also received media coverage from international finance publications including EuroMoney, Financial Times, The Wall Street Journal and Forbes.

Investors 
Kantox has received financing through various rounds of investment. Investors include venture capital firms Partech Ventures, Eurazeo and Cabiedes Partners, in addition to private financiers and web entrepreneurs. Most recently, in July 2021, Kantox raised €2 million from bank partner BNP Paribas and Investor Eurazeo.

See also
Midpoint (company)

References

External links

Crypto Reviews
Basic Cryptonomics

Financial technology
Foreign exchange companies
Financial services companies established in 2011
Announced mergers and acquisitions